Robert 'Bob' Clapham  is an Australian former rugby league footballer who played in the 1970s.

He was a St George junior at the Renown United club and went on to play President's Cup with St. George in 1968 with Ted Walton. Usually a lower grade player, Bob Clapham played four seasons at Saints between 1970 and 1973, which included 19 first grade games. He also played in the 1971 Grand Final.

References

St. George Dragons players
Australian rugby league players
2004 deaths
Rugby league centres
1948 births